Nacaduba biocellata, the double-spotted line blue, is a butterfly of the family Lycaenidae. It is found in Australia (including New South Wales, the Northern Territory, South Australia, Victoria and Western Australia), Singapore, the New Hebrides, Sumba and Bali.

The wingspan is about 20 mm. Adult females have a brown upperside, while the males are blue with narrow black margins. The underside of both sexes is pale brown with light and dark wavy lines.

The larvae feed on the shoots, flowers and buds of various Acacia species, including A. aneura, A. betchei, A. brachybotrya, A. deanei, A. erinaceae, A. irrorata, A. karroo, A. ligulata, A. osswaldii, A. penninervis, A. rigens, A. salicina, A. sclerophylla, A. sowdenii  and A. victoriae. They can have a wide range of colours depending on their host plant, including pink, orange, yellow or green. They are attended by ants, mostly Iridomyrmex  species, including I. purpureus  and I. viridiaeneus.

Pupation takes place in a pale brown pupa.

Subspecies
 Nacaduba biocellata biocellata (Australia)
 Nacaduba biocellata armillata (Butler, [1876]) (New Hebrides, Sumba)
 Nacaduba biocellata baliensis Tite, 1963 (Bali)

References

Nacaduba
Butterflies described in 1865
Butterflies of Oceania
Butterflies of Asia
Taxa named by Baron Cajetan von Felder
Taxa named by Rudolf Felder